Houvion is a surname. Notable people with the surname include:

 Maurice Houvion (born 1934), French pole vaulter and coach
 Philippe Houvion (born 1957), French pole vaulter